Stephen Ogochukwu Mozia (born August 16, 1993) is a US-born Nigerian shot putter. He is a three-time African Championships Bronze medallist. He also represented his country at the 2014 and 2016 World Indoor Championships, as well as the 2016 Summer Olympics.

Personal
He was born and raised in the United States though his parents were born in Nigeria. Early in 2014, due to his dual citizenship, began competing for the Nigeria National Team. He attended Hackensack High School where he was a standout athlete. He initially started out as a sprinter but decided to move to the throws because he was too slow. Mozia is a Mechanical Engineering graduate of Cornell University, where he was a member of the Quill and Dagger society. He also works as a marketing engineer for Emerson.

Career
After winning the US Junior championships in 2012, he represented the USA at the World Junior Championships where he finished in 10th place. In 2014, Mozia set college bests of 62.80 m and 20.79 m in the Discus Throw and Indoor Shot Put. His 20.79 m throw at the Ivy League Championships eclipsed Adam Nelson's Ivy League Indoor Record. He is also a two-time Ivy League Track Athlete of the Year. He finished twice as runner-up in the Shot Put at the 2014 NCAA Indoor and Outdoor Division 1 National Championships both times behind Ryan Crouser.

Later on in 2014, he represented Nigeria at the Glasgow Commonwealth Games and then at the African Championships in Marrakech. He won a bronze medal in the Discus Throw behind South African athletes, Victor Hogan and Russel Tucker. This led to him being selected for the IAAF Continental Cup as a representative for Africa.

Mozia broke into new territory in 2016, throwing over 21 metres in the Shot Put. He threw 21.03 m to set a Nigerian indoor record and bettered that twice eventually ending the indoor season with a 21.11 m throw. He however couldn't match this at the Portland Indoor Championships. In Portland, he finished in 12th place with a best of 19.84 m and had two fouls. He won Nigeria's first medal at the 2016 Durban African Championships, a bronze medal in the Shot Put. He finished behind South African Jaco Engelbrecht and Franck Elemba of the Democratic Republic of Congo. He went on to win another bronze medal in the Discus Throw, again behind Hogan and Tucker of South Africa.

After the Durban African Championships, he threw an outdoor PB and Nigerian Record of 20.82 m. Four days later he launched another record breaking throw of 21.27 m at the Athletics Grand Prix Usti nad Labem in Czech Republic. This was his first outdoor throw over 21 metres. He went on to better this with a 21.76 throw later in the competition. This took him up to second place in the All-Time African rankings behind Janus Robberts.

In 2016 he was selected to participate in the 2016 Summer Olympics in Rio de Jaineiro where he competed in the shot put and finished 28th overall. In addition, he has a best of 62.80 metres in the discus throw (Jacksonville 2014) which is also a Nigerian record.

Competition record

1Representing Africa

References

External links

All-Athletics profile -- Stephen Mozia
Stephen Mozia on Twitter

1993 births
Living people
American male shot putters
Cornell University alumni
Nigerian male shot putters
Place of birth missing (living people)
Athletes (track and field) at the 2014 Commonwealth Games
Athletes (track and field) at the 2018 Commonwealth Games
Athletes (track and field) at the 2016 Summer Olympics
Olympic athletes of Nigeria
Commonwealth Games competitors for Nigeria